William Coventre (fl. 1380s) was an English politician.

Coventre was a Member of Parliament for Devizes in October 1383 and 1393.

Coventre was Mayor of Devizes in 1388–1389.

References

Year of birth missing
Year of death missing
English MPs October 1383
14th-century births
Mayors of Devizes